Frank Albert Faulkinberry (November 27, 1887 – May 13, 1933) was an American football, basketball, and baseball player and coach. He was the father of football coach Russ Faulkinberry.

Early years
Faulkinberry was born on November 27, 1887, in Lincoln County, Tennessee, to Christopher Columbus Faulkinberry and Sarah Ellen Caple.

College athletics
Faulkinberry was a tackle on the Sewanee Tigers, thrice selected All-Southern. His play was once called "a thing to marvel at." He is a tackle on Sewanee's all-time second team. He was nominated though not selected for an Associated Press All-Time Southeast 1869-1919 era team. As a player, he stood some 6'4", 198 pounds. At Sewanee he was a member of Phi Delta Theta. Faulkinberry is a member of both the Sewanee Athletics Hall of Fame and the Blue Raiders Hall of Fame, having coached for years the Middle Tennessee Blue Raiders in both men and women's sports. He was also a Latin professor. Faulkinberry Drive on the Middle Tennessee State campus is named in his honor. Faulkinberry was inducted into the Sewanee Athletics Hall of Fame in 2014.

Professional baseball
For a few years he was a catcher in Minor League Baseball.

Coaching career
Faulkinberry began his coaching career at Morgan School, Butler School, and Brandon Training School before moving to Franklin Country High School in Decherd, Tennessee, where he coached football and baseball. In May 1926, he was hired as the athletic director and head coach at Middle Tennessee State Teachers College—now known as Middle Tennessee State University—in Murfreesboro, Tennessee.

Death
Faulkinberry was found shot to death in the garage of his home on May 13, 1933. It was a suspected suicide.

Head coaching record

College football

References

External links
 

1887 births
1933 suicides
American football tackles
American women's basketball coaches
Baseball catchers
Cleveland Counts players
Evansville Yankees players
Evansville River Rats players
Middle Tennessee Blue Raiders athletic directors
Middle Tennessee Blue Raiders baseball coaches
Middle Tennessee Blue Raiders football coaches
Middle Tennessee Blue Raiders men's basketball coaches
Middle Tennessee Blue Raiders women's basketball coaches
Sewanee Tigers football players
High school baseball coaches in the United States
High school football coaches in Tennessee
All-Southern college football players
People from Fayetteville, Tennessee
Coaches of American football from Tennessee
Players of American football from Tennessee
Baseball coaches from Tennessee
Baseball players from Tennessee
Basketball coaches from Tennessee
Suicides by firearm in Tennessee